Bradford Township is the name of some places in the U.S. state of Minnesota:
Bradford Township, Isanti County, Minnesota
Bradford Township, Wilkin County, Minnesota

See also
Bradford Township (disambiguation)

Minnesota township disambiguation pages